Piazza dei Signori is a city square in Vicenza, Italy.

Buildings around the square
Basilica Palladiana
Torre Bissara
Palazzo del Capitaniato
Palazzo del Monte di Pietà, Vicenza
San Vincenzo, Vicenza

Piazzas in Veneto
Vicenza